Khan Bahadur Abdul Aziz (1863–1926) was an educationist, writer and social worker from East Bengal.

Early life and career
Aziz was born into a Bengali Muslim family in Parshuram, Feni which was then in Noakhali District, Bengal Presidency. His father, Amjad Ali, was a personal assistant to the Commissioner of Chittagong division. Aziz graduated from Dhaka College in 1886. He was the first graduate of Chittagong Division. He started his career as a teacher at the Education Department of the Provincial Government. Later he became sub-inspector of schools.

In 1883, he established the "Dhaka Mussalman Suhrid Sammilani" and later "Mussalman Shiksa Sabha" in Chittagong. He founded Victoria Islam Hostel, Kabiruddin Memorial Library, Free Islamia Reading Room and Anjumane Ashate Islam (1896).

Literary works
Aziz wrote Ubedi Biyog, Kavita Kalika (1885) and Mayadnol Ulum (1892).

Personal life
Two of the grandchildren of Aziz were Habibullah Bahar Chowdhury and Shamsunnahar Mahmud. Poet Kazi Nazrul Islam composed an elegy "Banglar Aziz" (Aziz of Bengal) on Aziz's death. British government awarded him Khan Bahadur in recognition of his services.

References

1863 births
1926 deaths
People from Feni District
Bengali educators
Bengali writers
Dhaka College alumni